Farpoint may refer to:

Farpoint Observatory in Wabaunsee County, Kansas, United States
Farpoint (band), American Progressive Rock band 
"Encounter at Farpoint", first episode of television series Star Trek: The Next Generation
Far point, a measure of an individual's ability to see distant objects as clear and in focus
Farpoint (video game), a 2017 video game